Richard Anthony "Dick" Rydze (born March 15, 1950) is an American former diver who competed in the 1972 Summer Olympics. Rydze was born in Pittsburgh, Pennsylvania. He competed in diving at the University of Michigan and won his silver medal while obtaining his MD at the University of Pittsburgh School of Medicine.  He also served as one of the team doctors for the Pittsburgh Steelers from 1985 until June 2007.

Arrest

Dr. Rydze was charged in a 185-count indictment with conspiracy to illegally distribute steroids, human growth hormone and painkillers including oxycodone on October 17, 2012 and appeared in U.S. Court in Pittsburgh on October 19, 2012.

References

1950 births
Living people
Divers at the 1972 Summer Olympics
Olympic silver medalists for the United States in diving
University of Pittsburgh School of Medicine alumni
American male divers
Medalists at the 1972 Summer Olympics
Pan American Games medalists in diving
Pan American Games silver medalists for the United States
Divers at the 1971 Pan American Games
Michigan Wolverines men's swimmers
Medalists at the 1971 Pan American Games
20th-century American people